Kalamazoo Outrage was an American women’s soccer team, founded in 2007. The team was a member of the United Soccer Leagues USL W-League, the second tier of women’s soccer in the United States and Canada. The team played in the Midwest Division of the Central Conference.
The team folded after the 2010 season.

The team played its home games in the stadium on the campus of Loy Norrix High School in the city of Kalamazoo, Michigan. The club's colors was blue and white.

The team was a sister organization of the men's Kalamazoo Outrage team, which plays in the USL Premier Development League.

Players

Squad 2009

Year-by-year

External links
TKO Premier Soccer

Soccer clubs in Michigan
Women's soccer clubs in the United States
USL W-League (1995–2015) teams
2007 establishments in Michigan
2010 disestablishments in Michigan
Women's sports in Michigan